Fernando Herrero Tejedor (1920–1975) was a Spanish jurist and politician who was a member of the FET y de las JONS (FET), the ruling party of the Francoist Spain. He served as the minister-secretaries general of the movement between March and June 1975. He died in a car accident while serving in the post.

Early life and education
Herrero was born in Castellón de la Plana on 30 September 1920. His father was a military officer. Herrero joined the Spanish civil war, and after the war he became a member of the FET. He had a law degree in Valencia.

Career
Following the graduation Herrero began to work as the prosecutor of the provincial court in Castellón. He served in the civil government and the provincial headquarters of the FET in Castellón in 1955 and in Logroño in 1956. His another post was the civil governor of Segovia. He was made a member to the FET's national delegation of provinces in 1957. In 1961 he was appointed deputy secretary general of the FET, and on 30 September 1965 he was named the prosecutor of the Supreme Court. During this period he was also a member of the Parliament. On 5 March 1975 he was appointed secretary general of the movement to the cabinet led by Prime Minister Arias Navarro replacing Utrera Molina in the post.

Personal life and death
One of his children was Fernando Herrero-Tejedor Algar (1949–2014) who was also a jurist. His another son, Luis Herrero, is a journalist and a former Member of the European Parliament for Spain. On 12 June 1975 Herrero died in a traffic accident near Adanero near Ávila.

References

20th-century Spanish politicians
1920 births
1975 deaths
Government ministers during the Francoist dictatorship
Spanish jurists
FET y de las JONS politicians
Road incident deaths in Spain
People from Castellón de la Plana